Gamble Hill is an area of Bramley a few miles away from Leeds city centre, in the City of Leeds District, in the English county of West Yorkshire. The area falls within the Farnley and Wortley ward of the City of Leeds Council.

Amenities
Gamble Hill has a school and a community centre.

Location grid

References
West Yorkshire A-Z

Places in Leeds